SB-399885 is a drug which is used in scientific research. It acts as a potent, selective and orally active 5-HT6 receptor antagonist, with a Ki of 9.0nM. SB-399885 and other 5-HT6 antagonists show nootropic effects in animal studies, as well as antidepressant and anxiolytic effects which are comparable to and synergistic with drugs such as imipramine and diazepam, and have been proposed as potential novel treatments for cognitive disorders such as schizophrenia and Alzheimer's disease.

References 

5-HT6 antagonists
N-(2-methoxyphenyl)piperazines
Sulfonamides
Chlorobenzenes